Simplified Tamil script or Reformed Tamil script refers to several governmental reforms to the Tamil script.

In 1978, the Government of Tamil Nadu reformed certain syllables of the modern Tamil script with view to simplify the script. These reforms only spread in India and the digital world, whereas Sri Lanka, Singapore, Malaysia, Mauritius, Reunion and other Tamil speaking regions continue to use the traditional syllables.

Furthermore, only 13 out of 15 of the proposed simplifications were successful as people continued to use   instead of the proposed   and   instead of the proposed  .

History

Periyar E. V. Ramasamy was one of the people to suggest script reform. A Script Reform Committee was formed in 1947 under Periyar E. V. Ramasamy, while in 1951 the Government of Tamil Nadu accepted its recommendations, it failed to enforce them. He encouraged it on the basis that it allegedly eased typesetting as Periyar was himself a typesetter of his newspapers in early days. Other person who was responsible for helping Periyar was 

References

Spelling reform
Tamil language